Black Moon Spell is the third studio album by American musician King Tuff. It was released on September 23, 2014 under Sub Pop.

Critical reception
Black Moon Spell was met with generally favorable reviews from critics. At Metacritic, which assigns a weighted average rating out of 100 to reviews from mainstream publications, this release received an average score of 75, based on 15 reviews.

Accolades

Track listing

Charts

References

2014 albums
King Tuff albums
Sub Pop albums